The Estonian Drama Theatre is a theatre in Tallinn, Estonia. It has the role of a national theatre for Estonia. The Estonia Theatre is located next door.

History
The building that houses the Estonian Drama Theatre was originally built for the German theatre of Tallinn and completed in 1910 to designs by Saint Petersburg architects Nikolai Vassilyev and Alexey Bubyr. The style is Art Nouveau or, more specifically, National Romantic.

It was originally called the Drama Studio Theatre and rented the stage of the German theatre. In 1939 the theatre however purchased the building and has been housed there ever since. The theatre was renamed the Estonian Drama Theatre in 1937. During the Soviet occupation the theatre was called the Viktor Kingissepp Tallinn National Drama Theatre but it reverted to its old name in 1989, prior to Estonia's re-gained independence.

Theatre
The theatre today fulfills the role of an Estonian national theatre. It has three stages, with 436, 170 and 70 seats each. Both classical plays and new productions, including experimental plays, are staged at the theatre. Since it was founded, the Estonian Drama Theatre has cooperated with and staged plays by playwrights such as Hugo Raudsepp, August Kitzberg, Eduard Vilde, A. H. Tammsaare, Mats Traat, Jaan Kross and Oskar Luts. During the 1980s, the theatre took on a political role as it staged plays with themes critical to the Soviet occupation and in favour of Estonian independence by writers like Jaan Kruusvall and Rein Saluri.

See also

References

External links

Official website 

Theatres in Tallinn
Art Nouveau theatres
Theatres completed in 1910
Heritage listed buildings and structures in Estonia